William Morton Grinnell (February 28, 1857 – February 9, 1906) was a United States diplomat, lawyer, banker and author.

Early life

William Morton Grinnell was born in New York City on February 28, 1857, the son of William F. Grinnell and Mary (Morton) Grinnell (sister of Levi P. Morton). Another uncle, Daniel Oliver Morton (1815–59), served as the Mayor of Toledo, Ohio from 1849 to 1850.

He was educated in Stuttgart and at Phillips Exeter Academy.  He then studied at Harvard College, but left without taking a degree because of health problems, traveling to France, where his father had recently been appointed U.S. Consul at Saint-Étienne.  William Morton Grinnell worked for a while for the United States Consulate in Lyon.  He then attended Columbia Law School.

Career
After he was admitted to the bar, Grinnell practiced law briefly in New York City.  In 1881, he traveled to Paris, becoming Counsel of the U.S. Embassy there, a post he held until 1886.  While in France, he received degrees of bachelier ès lettres and bachelier en droit.  He returned to the United States and resumed his practice of law there in 1886.

In 1892, President of the United States Benjamin Harrison (whose vice president was Grinnell's uncle Levi P. Morton) appointed Grinnell Third Assistant Secretary of State, with Grinnell holding this office from February 15, 1892 until April 16, 1893.

Grinnell then returned to New York City to practice law.  In 1894, he joined the banking house of Morton, Bliss & Co. (run by his mother's family), and remained there following its incorporation into the Morton Trust.  His work there was interrupted by the outbreak of the Spanish–American War in 1898, at which time he joined the United States Army with the rank of Major.  He returned to banking after the war.

In addition to his work, Grinnell was a director of the Illinois Central Railroad, the Gunly Mountain Coal Company, the Mount Morris Bank, the Rio Grande, Sierra Madre & Pacific Railway, and the Sea Beach Land Company.  He also published several books on contemporaneous social and economic questions.

Personal life
On December 8, 1898, Grinnell married Elizabeth Lee Ernst (1871–1944), daughter of Oswald Herbert Ernst, the superintendent of the United States Military Academy.  Together, they had two children:

 Elizabeth Lee Grinnell (1900–1993), who married Henry L. Abbott. She later married second to David Munroe.
 George Morton Grinnell (1902–1953)

Grinnell died of pneumonia in New York City on February 9, 1906.

Works by William Morton Grinnell
A Comparative Glance at the French Code Civil and the Proposed New York Civil Code (1886)
The Regeneration of the United States: A Forecast of Its Industrial Evolution (1899)
Social Theories and Social Facts (1905)

References

External links

1857 births
1906 deaths
United States Assistant Secretaries of State
Phillips Exeter Academy alumni
Harvard College alumni
Columbia Law School alumni
American military personnel of the Spanish–American War
Deaths from pneumonia in New York City